Analyses of Social Issues and Public Policy is an annual peer-reviewed academic journal published by Wiley-Blackwell on behalf of the Society for the Psychological Study of Social Issues along with the Journal of Social Issues and Social Issues and Policy Review. The journal was established in 2001. The current editor-in-chief is Chris Aberson (Humboldt State University). The journal covers social psychological methods in the study of economic and social justice including ageism, heterosexism, racism, sexism, status quo bias, and other forms of discrimination, social problems such as climate change, extremism, homelessness, inter-group conflict, natural disasters, poverty, and terrorism, and social ideals such as democracy, empowerment, equality, health, and trust. Subscribers also receive a full subscription to the Journal of Social Issues and Social Issues and Policy Review.

Abstracting and indexing 
The journal is abstracted and indexed in:

External links 
 
 Society for the Psychological Study of Social Issues

References

Wiley-Blackwell academic journals
English-language journals
Publications established in 2001
Annual journals
Social psychology journals